Motohashi is a Japanese surname. Notable people with the surname include:

, Japanese Paralympic athlete
Akiyasu Motohashi, Japanese motorcycle racer
Hideyuki Motohashi, Japanese animator
, Japanese curler
, Japanese women's basketball player
, Japanese photographer
, Japanese footballer
, Japanese actress

Japanese-language surnames